Sokrogbo-Carrefour is a village in southern Ivory Coast. It is in the sub-prefecture of Tiassalé, Tiassalé Department, Agnéby-Tiassa Region, Lagunes District.

Sokrogbo-Carrefour was a commune until March 2012, when it became one of 1126 communes nationwide that were abolished.

Notes

Former communes of Ivory Coast
Populated places in Lagunes District
Populated places in Agnéby-Tiassa